Ultsch is a German language surname. It stems from a reduced form of the male given name Ulrich – and may refer to:
Bernhard Ultsch (1898), German World War I flying ace
Detlef Ultsch (1955), former East German judoka

References 

German-language surnames
Surnames from given names